

Kulliparu Conservation Park is a protected area in the Australian state of South Australia located on the Eyre Peninsula in the gazetted localities of Colley, Karcultaby, Mount Cooper and Mount Damper about  west of the town centre in Kyancutta.

The conservation park was proclaimed on 20 August 2009 under the state's National Parks and Wildlife Act 1972 in respect to crown land formerly dedicated as conservation reserve under the state's Crown Land Act 1929 on 11 November 1993 and added to on 21 April 1994 and 15 February 1996. The dedicated land is located in the cadastral units of the hundreds of Addison, Moorkitabie, Wallis, Witera and Wright and on land within the County of Robinson which has been not declared as a hundred. The proclamation in 2009 permits access under the state's Mining Act 1971.

The conservation park is classified as an IUCN Category VI protected area.

See also
Protected areas of South Australia

References

External links
Entry for Kulliparu Conservation Park on the Protected Planet website

Conservation parks of South Australia
Protected areas established in 1993
1993 establishments in Australia
Eyre Peninsula